The 2022–23 Virginia Cavaliers women's basketball team represents the University of Virginia during the 2022–23 NCAA Division I women's basketball season. The Cavaliers are led by first-year head coach Amaka Agugua-Hamilton, and play their home games at John Paul Jones Arena as members the Atlantic Coast Conference.

After firing Tina Thompson after the previous season, Virginia announced that Amaka Agugua-Hamilton would be the new head coach of the program.

Previous season

The Cavaliers finished the season 5–22 and 2–16 in ACC play to finish in a tie for fourteenth place.  As the fourteenth seed in the ACC tournament they lost their First Round matchup with Wake Forest.  They were not invited to the NCAA tournament or WNIT.  After the season, Virginia announced that Head Coach Tina Thompson had been relieved of her duties after going 30–63 during her tenure.

Offseason

Departures

Incoming transfers

Recruiting Class

Source:

Roster

Schedule

Source:

|-
!colspan=6 style=|Exhibition

|-
!colspan=6 style=|Regular season

|-
!colspan=6 style=| ACC Women's Tournament

Rankings

See also
 2022–23 Virginia Cavaliers men's basketball team

References

Virginia Cavaliers women's basketball seasons
Virginia
Virginia
Virginia